Honey is a 1930 American comedy film directed by Wesley Ruggles and written by Herman J. Mankiewicz. It is based on the 1916 novel Come Out of the Kitchen! by Alice Duer Miller. The film stars Nancy Carroll, Harry Green, Lillian Roth, Richard "Skeets" Gallagher, Stanley Smith and Mitzi Green. The film was released on March 29, 1930, by Paramount Pictures.

The film is chiefly remembered today for introducing the song "Sing, You Sinners", written by W. Franke Harling (music) and Sam Coslow (lyrics), performed by Roth. The number was re-created for the 1955 Roth biopic I'll Cry Tomorrow, starring Susan Hayward.

Cast
Nancy Carroll as Olivia Dangerfield
Harry Green as J. William Burnstein
Lillian Roth as Cora Falkner
Richard "Skeets" Gallagher as Charles Dangerfield
Stanley Smith as Burton Crane
Mitzi Green as Doris
ZaSu Pitts as Mayme
Jobyna Howland as Mrs. Falkner
Charles Sellon as Randolph Weeks

References

External links
 

1930 films
1930s English-language films
American comedy films
1930 comedy films
Paramount Pictures films
Films directed by Wesley Ruggles
American multilingual films
American black-and-white films
Films based on works by Alice Duer Miller
1930 multilingual films
1930s American films